The FIA Production car World Rally Championship, or PWRC, was a companion rally series to the World Rally Championship, contested mainly by Group N rally cars.

History
The series started in 1987 as FIA Cup for Production Rally Drivers and obtained the world championship status in 2002.
The eligible cars were still Group N modified road cars such as the Subaru Impreza WRX and the Mitsubishi Lancer Evolution. Between 2007 and 2009 the PWRC allowed Super 2000 cars alongside regular Group N entries. In 2010 the S2000 cars were moved to a dedicated championship named SWRC (Super 2000 World Championship). With the introduction of Group R cars since 2008, the PWRC was cancelled at the end of 2012 and was replaced by the World Rally Championship-3 open exclusively to 2WD based cars homologated in R1, R2 and R3 classes. The 4WD Group N cars were moved to the new World Rally Championship-2 alongside S2000, RRC, R4 and R5 cars.

Results

Drivers' Championship

See also
Junior World Rally Championship
World Rally Championship-2
World Rally Championship-3

References

External links
 PWRC at WRC.com
 PWRC at ewrc-results.com

Rally racing series

Defunct auto racing series
Recurring sporting events established in 1987
Recurring sporting events disestablished in 2012